Kinross is a settlement in Prince Edward Island. It is named after Kinross in Scotland. It is within the census subdivision of Lot 57, Prince Edward Island. Kinross borders three other communities: Uigg, Orwell, and Lyndale.

References

Communities in Queens County, Prince Edward Island